Nioella ostreopsis is a Gram-negative, short-rod-shaped, strictly aerobic and non-motile bacterium in the genus of Nioella which has been isolated from the dinoflagellate Ostreopsis lenticularis.

References 

Rhodobacteraceae
Bacteria described in 2020